David Montague de Burgh Kenworthy, 11th Baron Strabolgi (pronounced "Strabogie") (1 November 1914 – 24 December 2010), was a Labour Party peer.

Education
Strabolgi was educated at Gresham's School, Holt, and the Chelsea School of Art.

Appointments
 Captain of the Yeomen of the Guard: 11 March 1974 to 3 May 1979
 Deputy Chief Whip of the Labour Party in the House of Lords: 1974 to 1979

Title
The title of Baron Strabolgi was created in 1318 for the tenth Earl of Atholl. The barony twice went into long periods of abeyance, during which no claim to hold it could be established, the second of these lasting for over three hundred years.

The second period of abeyance was terminated in 1916 in favour of Cuthbert Kenworthy, the grandfather of the 11th Baron Strabolgi, who succeeded Joseph Kenworthy, 10th Baron Strabolgi, in 1953.

Death
Strabolgi died on 24 December 2010, at the age of 96. He was succeeded in the barony by his nephew, Andrew Kenworthy (born 1967), who became the 12th Baron Strabolgi.

Sources
The Complete Peerage, (1998)
Burke's Peerage and Baronetage, 106th Edition (1999)
Lord Strabolgi at thepeerage.com
Labour members of the House of Lords

1914 births
2010 deaths
Barons in the Peerage of England
Labour Party (UK) Baronesses- and Lords-in-Waiting
Deputy Lieutenants of Worcestershire
Officiers of the Légion d'honneur
People educated at Gresham's School
Labour Party (UK) hereditary peers

Hereditary peers elected under the House of Lords Act 1999